The 2022 Florida Chief Financial Officer election was held on November 8, 2022, to elect the Chief Financial Officer of Florida. Incumbent Republican CFO Jimmy Patronis won re-election to a second term.

Republican primary

Candidates

Nominee 
 Jimmy Patronis, incumbent Chief Financial Officer of Florida

Endorsements

Democratic primary

Candidates

Nominee
Adam Hattersley, former state representative and candidate for Florida's 15th congressional district in 2020

Did not qualify 
Tyrone Javellana, accountant

Withdrawn 
Karla Jones

Declined 
 Lauren Book, minority leader of the Florida Senate

Endorsements

Independent and third party candidates

Independent candidates

Withdrawn 

 Richard Dembinsky, perennial candidate

Did not qualify 
Benjamin Horbowy

General election

Polling

Results

Notes

See also 
 Chief Financial Officer of Florida

References

External links

Florida Division of Elections Candidate Tracking System
Official campaign websites
Adam Hattersley (D) for CFO
Jimmy Patronis (R) for CFO

Chief Financial Officer
Florida Chief Financial Officer elections
Florida